Matthew Richard Primus (born 12 January 1975) is a former coach of the Port Adelaide Football Club and Australian rules footballer, captain and All-Australian ruckman. He was also previously an assistant coach at the Gold Coast Football Club.

AFL career

Fitzroy career

Early career (1996)
Primus began his career with the Fitzroy Football Club in what was to be their final season in the AFL. At the end of the season, he had played 20 games and kicked five goals, becoming one of their key players. Primus signed with the Port Adelaide Football Club as an uncontracted zone player during their AFL establishment in 1996.

Port Adelaide career

Career high (1997–2002)
After finishing second in Fitzroy’s 1996 best and fairest and in the same position in Port Adelaide's 1997 best and fairest, Primus had established himself as one of the game's top ruckmen, but his close losses in the best and fairest counts would be a pointer to the bad luck he would face later in his career. 1999 saw Primus play only two games before a serious knee injury ruled him out for the year, yet the Power managed to improve on their combined record of 19-23-2 to reach seventh position. As his star rose as a player, Primus was also getting noticed off the field, being voted Cleo Magazine's ”Most Eligible Bachelor" in 1998. After the Power had a disappointing season in 2000, Primus was promoted to captain of the club in 2001, and led the team to a minor premiership in 2002 with only two losses in their last twenty home-and-away games before lack of finals experience told.

Injuries (2003–2004)
In 2003 Primus was hampered by hamstring and knee injuries, and only played nine games. The worst was yet to come, however, and 2004 would be the ultimate heartbreak for Primus. In his return game in Round 3, he suffered an ACL rupture after his left knee bent the wrong way, requiring a knee reconstruction and putting him out of the game for the rest of the 2004 season. Warren Tredrea took over the captaincy, and after plenty of near-misses in the finals, Port Adelaide would go on to win the premiership that year, with Primus missing out.

Final season (2005)
In 2005, Primus made another return to the AFL. His form was not indicative of the Primus of old, however, and it seemed Port were playing Primus out of respect that he was the captain. Not only that, but Port Adelaide were not the same strong side they were just a year earlier. While they eventually had a few results go their way and managed to scrape into the finals, Primus injured his knee again in the final round of the home-and-away season. He was expected to miss only the finals series at first, but later scans revealed that he would require a third knee reconstruction. The likelihood that he would not be able to play until 2007 meant Primus announced his retirement from the AFL at the age of 30.

Statistics

|- style="background-color: #EAEAEA"
! scope="row" style="text-align:center" | 1996
|
| 12 || 20 || 5 || 7 || 163 || 137 || 300 || 61 || 41 || 339 || 0.3 || 0.4 || 8.2 || 6.9 || 15.0 || 3.1 || 2.1 || 17.0 || 2
|- 
! scope="row" style="text-align:center" | 1997
|
| 2 || 22 || 6 || 1 || 179 || 89 || 268 || 74 || 38 || 255 || 0.3 || 0.0 || 8.1 || 4.0 || 12.2 || 3.4 || 1.7 || 11.6 || 9
|- style="background-color: #EAEAEA"
! scope="row" style="text-align:center" | 1998
|
| 2 || 18 || 4 || 2 || 105 || 128 || 233 || 55 || 34 || 289 || 0.2 || 0.1 || 5.8 || 7.1 || 12.9 || 3.1 || 1.9 || 16.1 || 4
|- 
! scope="row" style="text-align:center" | 1999
|
| 2 || 2 || 1 || 0 || 9 || 5 || 14 || 4 || 1 || 28 || 0.5 || 0.0 || 4.5 || 2.5 || 7.0 || 2.0 || 0.5 || 14.0 || 0
|- style="background-color: #EAEAEA"
! scope="row" style="text-align:center" | 2000
|
| 2 || 21 || 12 || 8 || 124 || 163 || 287 || 79 || 45 || 315 || 0.6 || 0.4 || 5.9 || 7.8 || 13.7 || 3.8 || 2.1 || 15.0 || 5
|- 
! scope="row" style="text-align:center" | 2001
|
| 1 || 22 || 9 || 5 || 137 || 156 || 293 || 85 || 60 || 488 || 0.4 || 0.2 || 6.2 || 7.1 || 13.3 || 3.9 || 2.7 || 22.2 || 10
|- style="background-color: #EAEAEA"
! scope="row" style="text-align:center" | 2002
|
| 1 || 24 || 23 || 8 || 140 || 180 || 320 || 91 || 75 || 490 || 1.0 || 0.3 || 5.8 || 7.5 || 13.3 || 3.8 || 3.1 || 20.4 || 9
|- 
! scope="row" style="text-align:center" | 2003
|
| 1 || 9 || 5 || 1 || 34 || 27 || 61 || 22 || 15 || 111 || 0.6 || 0.1 || 3.8 || 3.0 || 6.8 || 2.4 || 1.7 || 12.3 || 0
|- style="background-color: #EAEAEA"
! scope="row" style="text-align:center" | 2004
|
| 1 || 1 || 4 || 1 || 7 || 5 || 12 || 5 || 5 || 11 || 4.0 || 1.0 || 7.0 || 5.0 || 12.0 || 5.0 || 5.0 || 11.0 || 0
|- 
! scope="row" style="text-align:center" | 2005
|
| 1 || 18 || 12 || 10 || 87 || 87 || 174 || 50 || 35 || 289 || 0.7 || 0.6 || 4.8 || 4.8 || 9.7 || 2.8 || 1.9 || 16.1 || 2
|- class="sortbottom"
! colspan=3| Career
! 157
! 81
! 43
! 985
! 977
! 1962
! 526
! 349
! 2615
! 0.5
! 0.3
! 6.3
! 6.2
! 12.5
! 3.4
! 2.2
! 16.7
! 41
|}

Coaching career

Port Adelaide (2006–2012)
Primus was an assistant coach at Port Adelaide Football Club under senior coach Mark Williams from December 2005 to July 2010.

Just over midway through the 2010 season, with the Power’s record getting worse week by week, Williams stepped down as senior coach after Round 15, and Primus was appointed the caretaker senior coach for the remainder of the 2010 season. The club administration had started the search for a new coach and it was believed that the Power would appoint someone who had never been associated with the club before. Nevertheless, Primus was appointed as the senior coach of the club for three years.

He finished the 2011 season with a 3-19 win–loss record. In the 2012 season, he coached the team to a 5–13 record after nineteen rounds, but after the team's 34-point loss to struggling expansion team  in Round 19, Primus was informed that his contract would be terminated one year early at the end of the season; he opted to step down as senior coach immediately, on 6 August 2012, rather than coach out the remaining four matches, and he was replaced by Port Adelaide assistant coach Garry Hocking as caretaker senior coach for the remainder of the 2012 season. He left Port Adelaide with a winning percentage of just 27.7%.

Gold Coast Suns (2013–2018)
On 25 September 2013, Primus was announced as an assistant coach of the Gold Coast Suns. At the end of the 2018 season, Primus left the Gold Coast Suns after he was told that his contract would not be renewed as assistant coach as part of a clean-out at the club.

Personal life

Primus married Melissa Tucker in January 2007. They have three daughters together, Skye (born April 2006), Holly (born July 2007) and Georgia (born August 2008).
He is also the grandson of former Geelong Football Club player, captain and coach Reg Hickey.

Honours and achievements
Team:
Port Adelaide Pre Season Premiership 2001, 2002
Individual:
All Australian 2001, 2002
Port Adelaide second best and fairest 1997
Fitzroy second best and fairest 1996
Port Adelaide best and fairest 2002
Port Adelaide best team man 2000, 2001
Port Adelaide captain 2001–2005
Port Adelaide coach 2010–2012
International Rules Series 2002

References

External links 

Port Adelaide Football Club

Port Adelaide Football Club coaches
Norwood Football Club players
Fitzroy Football Club players
Port Adelaide Football Club players
Port Adelaide Football Club players (all competitions)
1975 births
Living people
All-Australians (AFL)
John Cahill Medal winners
Australian rules footballers from Geelong
Australian rules footballers from Victoria (Australia)
South Australian Football Hall of Fame inductees
Geelong Falcons players
Australia international rules football team players